This list includes people who were born in or lived in Breslau before 1945. For a list of famous residents after 1945, see List of notable people from Wrocław.

 Alois Alzheimer (1864–1915) a psychiatrist and neuropathologist, discovered Alzheimer's disease
 Paul Amman (1634–1691), German physician and botanist.
 Günther Anders (1902–1992) a German-Austrian Jewish émigré, philosopher, essayist and journalist.
 Adolf Anderssen (1818–1879) a German chess master.
 Đorđe Andrejević-Kun (1904–1964), a Serbian painter and academic.
 Heinz Arndt (1915–2002), an Australian economist
 Leopold Auerbach (1828–1897), a German anatomist and neuropathologist
 Joannes Aurifaber Vratislaviensis (1517–1568), a Lutheran theologian and Protestant reformer.
 Bertha Badt-Strauss (1885–1970), a German writer and Zionist.
 Boleslaw Barlog (1906–1999), a German stage, film and opera director
 Erhard Bauschke (1912–1945), a German jazz and light music reedist and bandleader.
 Max Berg (1870–1947), a German architect and urban planner, designed the Centennial Hall
 Dietrich Bonhoeffer (1906–1945), Lutheran clergyman, leader of the resistance against Nazism
 Max Born (1882–1970), a German physicist and mathematician, developed quantum mechanics
 August Borsig (1804–1854), a German businessman who made steam engines
 Ernst Cassirer (1874–1945), a German philosopher, main interests: Epistemology & aesthetics  
 Hendrik Claudius (c1655-1697), painter and apothecary
 Ferdinand Cohn (1828–1898), a biologist, a founder of modern bacteriology and microbiology.
 Richard Courant (1888–1972), a German American mathematician, wrote What Is Mathematics?
 Harri Czepuck (1927–2015), a German journalist.
 Walter Damrosch (1862–1950), an American conductor and composer.
 John Gunther Dean (1926–2019), an American diplomat, the United States ambassador to five nations.
 Johann Dzierzon (1811–1906), a Polish beekeeper, discovered parthenogenesis in bees.
 Hermann von Eichhorn (1848–1918), a Prussian Generalfeldmarschall during WWI.
 Norbert Elias (1897–1990), a German/British sociologist, worked on civilizing/decivilizing processes.
 Eduard Vogel von Falckenstein (1797-1885), a Prussian General der Infanterie
 Friedrich Karl Georg Fedde (1873–1942}, a German botanist.
 George Forell (1919–2011), a scholar, author, lecturer and guest professor re. Christian ethics.
 Otfrid Förster (1873–1941) a German neurologist and neurosurgeon
 Heinz Fraenkel-Conrat (1910–1999) a biochemist, researched viruses.
 Zecharias Frankel (1801–1875), rabbi and founder of Conservative Judaism
 Hans Freeman (1929–2008), Australian bioinorganic chemist and protein crystallographer
 Friedrich von Gentz (1764–1832), a German diplomat and writer.
 Alfred Gomolka (1942–2020), a German politician and MEP
 Rudolf von Gottschall (1823–1909), a German poet, dramatist, literary critic and literary historian. 
 Felix Hausdorff (1868–1942), mathematician, one of the founders of algebraic topology
 Martin Helwig (1516–1574) a German cartographer, created the first map of Silesia
 Sir George Henschel (1850–1934) a British baritone, pianist, conductor and composer.
 Johann Heß (1490–1547), Lutheran theologian, Protestant reformer of Breslau and Silesia
 Christian Hoffmann von Hoffmannswaldau (1616–1679) a German poet of the Baroque era
 August, Prince of Hohenlohe-Öhringen (1784–1853), a German general and nobleman.
 Karl von Holtei (1798–1880), German poet and actor.
 E. A. J. Honigmann (1927–2011), a British scholar of English Literature
 Heinz Hopf (1894–1971), a German mathematician who worked on topology and geometry.
 Vernon Ingram (1924–2006), a German–American academic professor of biology in the US.
 Gustav Adolph Kenngott (1818–1897), a German mineralogist.
 Alfred Kerr (1867–1948), theatre critic and essayist
 Gustav Kirchhoff (1824–1887), a German physicist, dealt with electrical circuits and spectroscopy
 Gerhard Kittel (1888–1948), a German Lutheran theologian and lexicographer of biblical languages.
 Otto Klemperer (1885–1973), orchestral conductor and composer
 August Kopisch (1799–1853), a German poet and painter.
 Wojciech Korfanty (1873–1939), a Polish activist, journalist and politician. 
 Arthur Korn (1870–1945), physicist, invented transmission of photographs by facsimile and wireless
 Arthur Korn (1891–1978), a German architect and urban planner, proponent of modernism
 Carl Ferdinand Langhans (1782–1869), a Prussian architect whose specialty was theatres.
 Carl Gotthard Langhans (1732–1808), a Prussian master builder and royal architect.
 Ferdinand Lassalle (1825–1864), a Prussian-German jurist, philosopher and socialist.
 Carl Friedrich Lessing (1808–1880), a German historical and landscape painter.
 Marie Leszczyńska (1703 in Trzebnica – 1768), Queen consort of France.
 Daniel Casper von Lohenstein (1635–1683), a Baroque Silesian playwright, lawyer, diplomat and poet 
 Peter Lorre (1904–1964), an Austrian-Hungarian and American actor. 
 Georg Lunge (1839–1923), a German chemist.
 Rudolf Meidner (1914–2005), a Swedish economist and socialist theorist 
 Joachim Meisner (1933–2017), Cardinal priest and archbishop of Cologne
 Adolph Menzel (1815–1905), a German Realist artist noted for drawings, etchings and paintings.
 Jan Mikulicz-Radecki (1850-1905), surgeon, contributed to development of modern surgery
 Richard Mohaupt (1904–1957), a German composer and Kapellmeister.
 Edda Moser (born 1938), a German operatic soprano.
 Moritz Moszkowski (1854–1925), a composer, pianist and teacher of Polish-Jewish descent.
 Hugo von Pohl (1855–1916), a German admiral, commander of High Seas Fleet
 Louis Prang (1824–1909), printer, lithographer and publisher
 Michael Oser Rabin (born 1931), mathematician and computer scientist
 Manfred von Richthofen (1892–1918), World War I flying ace (the "Red Baron")
 Oskar von Riesenthal (1830–1898) a German forester, ornithologist, hunter and writer.
 Ludwig Rosenfelder (1813-1881), German painter
 Horst Rosenthal (1915–1942), German-born French cartoonist
 Julius von Sachs (1832–1897), a German botanist. 
 Johann Gottfried Scheibel (1783–1843), theological professor and dissenter to the Prussian Union
 Friedrich Schleiermacher (1768–1834) a Reformed theologian, philosopher and biblical scholar
 Auguste Schmidt (1833–1902), a German feminist, educator, journalist and women's rights activist.
 Margarethe Siems (1879–1952), a German operatic coloratura soprano
 Angelus Silesius (ca.1624–1677), a German Catholic priest, physician, mystic and religious poet.
 Karl Slotta (1895–1987), biochemist
 Edith Stein (1891–1942), philosopher and Roman Catholic martyr
 Michael Steinberg (1928–2009) an American music critic and author
 Fritz Stern (1926–2016), American historian of German & Jewish history and historiography.
 Friedrich Wilhelm von Steuben (1730–1794), Inspector General of the Continental Army during the American Revolutionary War
 Siegbert Tarrasch (1862–1934), chess player
 Augustin Theiner ((1804–1874), theologian and Church historian of the Vatican Apostolic Archive
 August Tholuck  (1799–1877), a German Protestant theologian, pastor and historian.
 Michel Thomas (1914–2005), war hero and language teacher.  
 Zacharias Ursinus (1534–1583) a German Reformed theologian and Protestant reformer.              
 Christian Wolff (1679–1754), a German philosopher.
 Adolf Wuttke (1819–1870) a German Protestant theologian.
 Johann Heinrich Zedler (1706–1751), publisher of a German encyclopedia, the Grosses Universal-Lexicon.

Nobel laureates 

listed by year of award 
 Theodor Mommsen (1902)
 Philipp Lenard (1905)
 Eduard Buchner (1907)
 Paul Ehrlich (1908)
 Gerhart Hauptmann (1912)
 Fritz Haber (1918)
 Friedrich Bergius (1931)
 Erwin Schrödinger (1933)
 Otto Stern (1943)
 Max Born (1954)
 Reinhard Selten (1994)

References

 
Breslau
Breslau